Pinitol is a cyclitol, a cyclic polyol. It is a known anti-diabetic agent isolated from Sutherlandia frutescens leaves. Gall plant tannins can be differentiated by their content of pinitol. It was first identified in the sugar pine (Pinus lambertiana). It is also found in other plants, such as in the pods of the carob tree.

Certain variants of the bacteria Pseudomonas putida have been used in organic synthesis, the first example being the oxidation of benzene, employed by Steven Ley in the synthesis of (±)-pinitol.

Glycosides
Ciceritol is a pinitol digalactoside that can be isolated from seeds of chickpea, lentil and white lupin.

A cyclitol derivative can be found in the marine sponge Petrosia sp.

Biosynthesis 
D-pinitol is the most widely distributed inositol ether in plants. In Angiosperms, D-pinitol has a relatively straight forward and short biosynthesis which proceeds via the Loewus pathway. The precursor to the biosynthesis pathway is glucose-6-phosphate, which is converted to D-ononitol (1-D-4-O-methyl-myo-inositol) via myo-inositol. Ononitol is epimerized to yield D-pinitol via a D-ononitol epimerase using NADPH as a cofactor.

References

External links 
 Pinitol on Sigma Aldrich website

Cyclitols